Monica Seles defeated Gabriela Sabatini in the final, 6–4, 5–7, 3–6, 6–4, 6–2 to win the singles tennis title at the 1990 Virginia Slims Championships. The final lasted 3 hours and 47 minutes, the longest final by time in the tournament's history.

Steffi Graf was the defending champion, but lost in the semifinals to Sabatini.

Seeds

Note
  Martina Navratilova had qualified but withdrew due to knee surgery

Draw

Finals
 NB: The final was the best of 5 sets while all other rounds were the best of 3 sets.

See also
WTA Tour Championships appearances

References

Singles 1990
1990 WTA Tour